Vendetta, known in Japan as , is a 1991 side-scrolling beat-'em-up arcade game developed and published by Konami. It is the sequel to 1989 Konami's Crime Fighters, although it was marketed internationally as a stand-alone game with no previous connections.

Gameplay

The four men of the game's hero gang, The Cobras, fight through waves of enemies to rescue Kate, The Cobras' fifth member, who was kidnapped by the Dead End Gang. As with most beat-em-ups, the game features primarily side-scrolling action. Player score is based on number of opponents eliminated.

The option of attacking an enemy while they are knocked down was new to the genre. The game uses 'punch' and 'kick' buttons rather than 'jump' and 'attack'. The special punch-plus-kick attack is the only aerial attack. Every time this special attack is performed, it takes away one bar of energy from the character. The players can also use different weapons that belong to enemies or are hidden inside boxes, including a shotgun (with limited cartridges), baseball bats, knives, and bottles. Players can also double-team enemies and vice versa.

After defeating the Big Boss at the end of the chapters, the game continues: first it resuscitates all the bosses for a massive final fight, and if the player defeats them all, then the game repeats endlessly, with an amped-up level of difficulty.

Plot
Dead End City is a place controlled with a firm grip by the "Dead End" gang, an endless parade of violent criminals. Their only obstacle is the opposing hero gang, called The Cobras. The Cobras number five members: Blood (former prizefighter, with a passing resemblance to Wesley Snipes), Hawk (former professional wrestler, with a passing resemblance to Hulk Hogan), Boomer (a martial artist, possibly based on Jean-Claude Van Damme), Sledge (a military ex-convict with a passing resemblance to Mr. T) and Kate, the damsel in distress, described as Hawk's protegee and wearing a blue shirt similar to his. One day, Kate is kidnapped by the Dead End Gang under the leadership of Faust, who is looking for the leadership of all street gangs in an attempt to take full control of the city. The four men go to enemy territory to save Kate, fighting through the waves of enemies sent against them.

Development
Vendetta was showcased at the 1991 Las Vegas Amusement Expo.

Censorship
Vendetta was censored in some countries when released outside of the Asian market (particularly in the United States, while the uncensored version was released in some countries, like Argentina), as to remove an enemy character who dresses in leather (in a S & M style) and fights by grabbing hold of the playable character and then proceeding to dry hump and lick him. This character also continues to do the same if the protagonist is down. A second type of dog enemy was also removed from the game for trying to do something similar to the character.

Reception
In Japan, Game Machine listed Vendetta on their August 1, 1991 issue as being the third most-successful table arcade unit of the month. In North America, it was the top-grossing new video game on the RePlay arcade charts in September 1991.

British gaming magazine The One reviewed Vendetta in 1991, reviewing it alongside 'D.D. Crew, stating that "one will probably face into insignificance at the expense of the other. If it was up to me, Konami's Vendetta would be the one to take the prizes." The One praises D.D. Crew's sprite size and "well-crafted" graphics, however, they call the gameplay "fine"  but "all a bit sterile", stating that Vendetta has "a lot more atmosphere", and the graphics, while smaller, are "much more imaginatively drawn - and the animations are smooth and inventive." The One states that "Vendetta has both class and imagination" and calls its gameplay "a cathartic experience".

Sinclair User magazine awarded it "Best Beat'Em Up Game" in 1991, along with Technōs Japan's WWF WrestleFest.

In 2023, Time Extension included the game on their top 25 "Best Beat 'Em Ups of All Time" list.

References

External links
 
 
 Vendetta at GameFAQs

1991 video games
Arcade video games
Arcade-only video games
Konami beat 'em ups
Cooperative video games
Nintendo Switch games
PlayStation 4 games
Side-scrolling beat 'em ups
Video games scored by Michiru Yamane
Konami arcade games
Video games developed in Japan

ja:クライムファイターズ#クライムファイターズ2
Hamster Corporation games